Black is a single-member electoral district for the South Australian House of Assembly. It was created by the redistribution conducted in 2016, and was contested for the first time at the 2018 state election.

Black is named after Dorrit Black (Dorothea Foster Black, 1891–1951), a South Australian modern artist, best known for linocuts, oil and watercolour paintings.

Black lies south-west of the Adelaide city centre and includes the suburbs of Darlington, Hallett Cove, Kingston Park, Marino, O'Halloran Hill, Seacliff, Seacliff Park, Seacombe Heights, Seaview Downs, Sheidow Park and Trott Park. At its creation, Black was projected to be notionally held by the Liberal Party with a swing of 2.6% required to lose it. The 2018 creation of Black replaced the electorate of Mitchell that was disestablished at the 2018 state election. Black does not extend as far north or south as Mitchell did, but extends west to the coast through part of what used to be Bright.

Members for Black

Election results

Notes

References
 ECSA profile for Black: 2018
 ABC profile for Black: 2018
 Poll Bludger profile for Black: 2018

Black
2018 establishments in Australia